Sir Jeremy Whichcote, 1st Baronet (c. 1614–1677), was an English barrister and Solicitor-General to the Frederick V of the Palatinate. He was the owner of the manor of Totteridge in north London.

Early life and education
Jeremy Whichcote was born around 1614. He was a barrister-at-law and Solicitor-General to the Elector Palatine, His wife Anne (died August 1714) was the eldest daughter and heir of Joseph Grave. He was brother to Benjamin Whichcote and Elizabeth Foxcroft, mother of Ezechiel Foxcroft.

Whichcote bought the post of Warden of Fleet Prison and, during the Commonwealth, was able to shelter the king's friends and agents in this way.
He was created a baronet on 2 April 1660 to reward him for his services to the exiled King Charles II.)

Hendon and Totteridge
Whichcote was resident at Hendon House, in the grounds of which Hendon School now stands, until his death in 1677.

He was the owner of the manor of Totteridge in north London.

Death
Whichcote died in 1677 and is buried at St Mary's Church, Hendon.

References 

1614 births
1677 deaths
Baronets in the Baronetage of England
Lords of the Manor of Totteridge
English barristers